V de V Series is a motor racing organisation that owns and runs a group of international motor racing championships. Based in Paris, the majority of events are held in France although the series regularly visits Spain and Portugal and has also visited Belgium, Germany and Italy. The organisation takes its name from founder Eric van de Vyver. His family is involved in most aspects of running the series and they have their own racing team within the series.

Championships
V de V has hosted five separate championships;
 Challenge Monoplace, for open wheel racing cars
 Challenge Endurance Proto, for prototype sports racing cars
 Challenge Endurance GT/Tourisme, for GT sport cars and touring cars
 Challenge Funyo, a one-make series of prototype sports racing cars
 Challenge Endurance VHC, for historic GT sport cars and touring cars
The series are recognised and sanctioned by the FIA as International Series.

Challenge Monoplace

Introduced in 2010, this series caters for a wide variety of eligible open wheel racing cars, mostly second hand from other series. The majority of present cars are Formula Renault 2.0L cars built by Tatuus or Barazi-Epsilon. Formula 3, Formula Master, Formula Nissan, Formula Renault 1.6L, Formula Campus, Formula BMW, Formula Abarth and some Formula Fords are also eligible. Champions sourced from:

Challenge Funyo
Single-maque competition with prototypes from Y.O Concept (Funyo).

Champions sourced from:

Challenge Endurance Proto
Champions sourced from:

Challenge Endurance GT/Tourisme
Champions sourced from:

Challenge Endurance VHC
VHC stands for Véhicule historiques de compétition. Originally there was only one overall champion. For the 2009 season, the championships for Prototype and GT cars were separated. Champions sourced from:

Racing team
The racing team owns a Mosler MT900 GT3 which races in the Endurance GT/Tourisme, and a TVR Griffith and Hema Porsche which race in Endurance VHC. In 2015 their primary team parked the Mosler and began racing an Audi R8 LMS in conjunction with AB Sport racing team.

References

External links
 Official website

Auto racing series in France
Multi-sport events in France